Myrcia calcicola is a species of plant in the family Myrtaceae. It is endemic to Jamaica and is threatened by habitat loss.

References

calcicola
Vulnerable plants
Endemic flora of Jamaica
Taxonomy articles created by Polbot